The following is a list of stadiums in Central Asia, East Asia, South Asia, Southeast Asia, and West Asia.

Central Asia

Afghanistan
 National Stadium, Kabul
 Kabul National Cricket Stadium, Kabul
 Ghazi Amanullah Khan International Cricket Stadium, Jalalabad
 Khost City Stadium, Khost City
 Kandahar International Cricket Stadium, Kandahar
 Ghazi Stadium, Kabul
 Afghanistan Football Federation Stadium, Kabul

Kazakhstan
Astana Arena, Astana
Kazhimukan Munaitpasov Stadium (Shymkent), Shymkent

Kyrgyzstan
Spartak Stadium, Bishkek

Tajikistan
Pamir Stadium, Dushanbe

Turkmenistan
 Ashgabat Olympic Stadium, Ashgabat
 Köpetdag Stadium, Ashgabat
 Nusaý Stadium, Ashgabat
 Garaşsyzlyk Stadium, Dashoguz
 Sport toplumy (Abadan)
 Sport toplumy (Balkanabat)
 Sport toplumy (Daşoguz)
 Sport toplumy (Mary)
 Türkmenabat Stadium, Türkmenabat
 Zähmet Stadium
 Şagadam Stadium

Uzbekistan
Bunyodkor Stadium, Tashkent
Pakhtakor Markaziy Stadium, Tashkent
Markaziy Stadium, Bukhoro
Markaziy Stadium, Kosonsoy
Markaziy Stadium, Namangan

East Asia

China

Mainland

Hong Kong

Macau 
Estádio Campo Desportivo, Taipa, Municipality of the Islands

Republic of China

Chungcheng Stadium, Kaohsiung
Taichung Stadium, Taichung
Tainan County Stadium, Tainan
Taipei County Stadium, Panchiao
Taipei Dome, Taipei
Tainan Dome, Tainan
Taiwan Provincial Stadium, Taichung
Taoyuan County Stadium, Taoyuan City
National Stadium, Kaohsiung
Yunlin County Stadium, Dounan

Japan

North Korea

Chandongcha Park, Chongjin
Haeju Stadium, Haeju
Kim Il-sung Stadium, Pyongyang
May Day Stadium, Pyongyang
Nampo Stadium, Nampo
Pyongyang Arena, Pyongyang
Seosan Stadium, Pyongyang
Sinuiju Stadium, Sinuiju
Western Kaesong Park, Kaesong
Wonsan Stadium, Wonsan
Yanggakdo Stadium, Pyongyang

South Korea

Mongolia
National Sports Stadium, Ulaanbaatar

South Asia

Bangladesh

Bhutan
Changlimithang Stadium, Thimphu

India

Maldives
Rasmee Dhandu Stadium, Male

Nepal

Pakistan

Sri Lanka

Southeast Asia

Brunei Darussalam
Hassanal Bolkiah National Stadium, Bandar Seri Begawan

Cambodia
Phnom Penh National Olympic Stadium, Phnom Penh
RCAF Old Stadium Phnom Penh
Svay Rieng Stadium, Svay Rieng
RSN Stadium, Phnom Penh
Western Stadium, Phnom Penh
Cambodia Airways Stadium Phnom Penh
SRU Stadium Siem Reap
Prince Stadium Phnom Penh
Svay Thnom Stadium Siem Reap

East Timor
National Stadium, Dili

Indonesia

Laos
Laos National Stadium, Vientiane
New Laos National Stadium, Vientiane
Champasak Stadium, Pakse

Malaysia

Myanmar
Bogyoke Aung San Stadium, Yangon
Thuwanna YTC Stadium, Yangon
Wunna Theikdi Stadium, Nay Pyi Daw
Mandalarthiri Stadium, Mandalay
Zayarthiri Stadium, Nay Pyi Daw

Philippines

Singapore

Bedok Stadium
Bishan Stadium
Bukit Gombak Stadium
Choa Chu Kang Stadium
Hougang Stadium
Jalan Besar Stadium
Jurong East Stadium
Jurong Stadium
Jurong West Stadium
National Stadium
Queenstown Stadium
Singapore Indoor Stadium
Tampines Stadium
The Float@Marina Bay
Toa Payoh Stadium
Woodlands Stadium
Yishun Stadium

Thailand

Vietnam

West Asia

Armenia
Banants Stadium, Yerevan
Gyumri City Stadium, Gyumri
Hrazdan Stadium, Yerevan
Kotayk Stadium, Abovyan
Republican Stadium, Yerevan
Mika Stadium, Yerevan

Azerbaijan

Bahrain
Bahrain National Stadium, Riffa
 Muharruq Stadium
 Al Ahli Stadium

Georgia
Boris Paichadze Stadium, Tbilisi
Mikheil Meskhi Stadium, Tbilisi
Givi Kiladze Stadium, Kutaisi
Tengiz Burjanadze Stadium, Gori
Erosi Manjgaladze Stadium, Samtredia
Poladi Stadium, Rustavi
Municipal Stadium (Zestafoni), Zestafoni
Gulia Tutberidze Stadium, Zugdidi
Fazisi Stadium, Poti
Shevardeni Stadium, Tbilisi
Tsentral Stadium (Batumi), Batumi
Tamaz Stephania Stadium, Bolnisi

Iran

Iraq
Al Shaab Stadium, Baghdad
Franco Hariri Stadium, Arbil
Kirkuk Olympic Stadium, Kirkuk
Basra Sports City, Basra
Karbala Sports City, Karbala
Maysan Stadium, Amarah

Israel
Teddy Stadium, Jerusalem
Bloomfield Stadium, Tel Aviv
Sammy Ofer Stadium, Haifa
Turner Stadium, Be'er Sheva
Netanya Stadium, Netanya
HaMoshava Stadium, Petah Tikva
Ramat Gan Stadium, Ramat Gan, Tel Aviv District
Canada Stadium, Ramat HaSharon, Tel Aviv District

Jordan

Kuwait 
Al-Sadaqua Walsalam Stadium, Kuwait City
Jaber Al-Ahmad International Stadium, Kuwait City
Kazma SC Stadium, Kuwait City
Sabah Al Salem Stadium, Kuwait City
Al Kuwait Sports Club Stadium, Kuwait City
Mohammed Al-Hamad Stadium, Hawalli
Thamir Stadium, Hawalli
Al Shabab Mubarak Alaiar Stadium, Jahra

Lebanon
Camille Chamoun Sports City Stadium, Beirut

Oman
Al Saada Stadium, Salalah
Royal Oman Police Stadium, Muscat
Salalah Sports Complex, Salalah
Seeb Stadium, Seeb
Sultan Qaboos Sports Complex, Muscat
Sur Sports Complex, Sur

Palestine
Palestine Stadium, gaza
Faisal Al-Husseini International Stadium, A-Ram
Jericho International Stadium, Jericho

Qatar
Al Bayt Stadium, Al Khor
Ahmed bin Ali Stadium, Al-Rayyan
Education City Stadium, Al-Rayyan
Khalifa International Stadium, Al-Wakrah
Khalifa International Tennis and Squash Complex, Doha
Lusail Iconic Stadium, Lusail
Ras Abu Aboud Stadium, Doha
Al Thumama Stadium, Doha
West End Park International Cricket Stadium, Doha

Saudi Arabia
King Abdul Aziz Stadium, Makkah
King Abdullah Sports City, Jeddah
King Fahd International Stadium, Riyadh
Prince Abdul Aziz bin Musa'ed Stadium, Ha'il
Prince Abdullah al-Faisal Stadium, Jeddah
Prince Faisal bin Fahd Stadium, Riyadh
Prince Mohamed bin Fahd Stadium, Dammam
Prince Sultan bin Fahd Stadium, Jeddah

Syria
Abbasiyyin Stadium, Damascus
Al-Assad Stadium, Latakia
Al-Baath Stadium, Jableh
Al Basil Stadium, Latakia
Al-Hamadaniah Stadium, Aleppo
Al-Jalaa Stadium, Damascus
Aleppo International Stadium, Aleppo
Khaled Ibn Al Walid Stadium, Homs

Turkey

United Arab Emirates
 Dubai International Cricket Stadium, Dubai
 ICC Academy Ground, Dubai
Sheikh Khalifa International Stadium, Al Ain
Sheikh Mohamed Bin Zayed Stadium, Abu Dhabi
Sheikh Zayed Stadium, Abu Dhabi
Zabeel Stadium, Dubai
Hazza bin Zayed Stadium, Al Ain
 Sharjah Cricket Stadium, Sharjah

Yemen
Althawra Sports City Stadium, San‘a’

See also
List of stadiums in Africa
List of stadiums in Central America and the Caribbean
List of stadiums in Europe
List of stadiums in North America
List of stadiums in Oceania
List of stadiums in South America
List of Asian stadiums by capacity

External links 
Atlas of worldwide soccer stadiums for GoogleEarth ***NEW***
worldstadiums
Football Stadiums
Football Temples of the World

Stadiums
Asia